Santa Clara Transit Center (also called Santa Clara–University by Amtrak) is a railway station in downtown Santa Clara, California. It is served by Caltrain, Amtrak Capitol Corridor, and Altamont Corridor Express (ACE) trains. It is the planned terminus for the Silicon Valley BART extension into Santa Clara County. The former station building, constructed in 1863 by the San Francisco and San Jose Railroad, is used by the Edward Peterman Museum of Railroad History.

Station design 

The station is an intermodal transportation center, with Caltrain and Altamont Corridor Express train service and bus service operated by the Santa Clara Valley Transportation Authority (VTA).

The station has a side platform serving the southbound Caltrain track (Track 3) and an island platform for the northbound Caltrain track (Track 2) and the ACE/Amtrak track (Track 1). The island platform is connected to the side platform by a pedestrian tunnel that was completed in 2012. Additional tracks northeast of Track 1 are used by Union Pacific freight trains.

History 

The Santa Clara depot, built by the San Francisco and San Jose Railroad in late 1863, was the oldest continuously operating railroad depot in the State of California until the ticket office was closed in May 1997. The original  board and batten depot was one of the two "way stations" built between San Francisco and San Jose. Plans for a railroad linking San Francisco and San Jose began as early as 1851. Though the 1851 scheme ultimately failed, the incorporation of the San Francisco and San Jose Railroad in 1859 met with success. Most of the financing for the project came from county government in San Francisco, San Mateo and Santa Clara counties, with the University of Santa Clara and local industry also playing a significant role in both stock acquisition and choice of placement of the depot in Santa Clara.

The first passenger service to San Francisco started in January 1864. The Southern Pacific Railroad acquired the San Francisco & San Jose Railroad in 1868. The depot, originally on the east side of the tracks, was moved to its present location in 1877 and attached to the existing  freight house constructed several years earlier.

On November 1, 1877, the San Jose Mercury reported the facility nearing completion. Following construction of the railroad, farming and fruit-related industries developed in the Santa Clara area, with the depot serving as a focal point for shipping. Rail service provided the direct link to San Francisco and, in the later 1870s, to Southern California. Typical of these efforts were those of James A. Dawson, who pioneered the area's fruit-canning industry in 1871. By the turn of the century, the Pratt-Low Preserving Company, the largest fruit packing plant in central California, was located just south of the depot.

The California Department of Transportation acquired the depot from Southern Pacific in 1980. It was placed in the National Register of Historic Places in 1985. In cooperation with the South Bay Historical Railroad Society, a nonprofit group founded the same year, they began renovation work in 1986 on the depot, by then badly in need of repair. A group of volunteers spent over 25,000 hours hauling away debris, replacing support timbers, siding, exterior decking and interior flooring, scraping peeling paint, painting and many other repairs. With the major renovation complete since 1992, this 156-year-old building hosts a railroad library and museum with 2 large model railroad layouts and many other artifacts while still serving its original function as a passenger depot.

Santa Clara was added as a station for the Altamont Corridor Express (ACE) on March 5, 2001. ACE service to the station was discontinued on July 29, 2005, to allow for platform construction. ACE service to Santa Clara resumed on May 14, 2012; Amtrak Capitol Corridor trains began stopping at the station on May 21.

Future 
Santa Clara is planned to be the terminal station for the second phase of the Silicon Valley BART extension. Santa Clara was chosen as the terminal because of the access to the San Jose International Airport as well as the proposed BART maintenance facility located in the vicinity of the station at the former Union Pacific rail yard. A new island platform will be constructed with a pedestrian underpass. An 800-space parking facility is included in the plans, and VTA is expected to develop transit oriented spaces adjacent the station.

The station was considered for California High-Speed Rail, but was rejected on the grounds that it was too close to the nearby, and much larger, Diridon Station in San Jose, and that the airport traffic that it would receive would not be enough to justify maintaining a separate station. It was also considered as the terminal for a people mover to the airport; however, San Jose Diridon was later chosen as the terminal.

References

External links 

Santa Clara – ACE

Santa Clara – Caltrain
Santa Clara Transit Center – VTA

Amtrak stations in Santa Clara County, California
Caltrain stations in Santa Clara County, California
Altamont Corridor Express stations in Santa Clara County, California
Former Southern Pacific Railroad stations in California
National Register of Historic Places in Santa Clara County, California
Railway stations in the United States opened in 1864
Railway stations on the National Register of Historic Places in California
Buildings and structures in Santa Clara, California
Railroad museums in California
Railway stations in California at university and college campuses
Future Bay Area Rapid Transit stations